Poland has a rich selection of gold and silver commemorative coins. In the year 2000 coins were launched in the series: "Animals of the World", "Castles and palaces of Poland", "Polish kings and princes" and various occasional coins.

Table of contents

See also

 Numismatics
 Regular issue coinage
 Coin grading

References

Commemorative coins of Poland